Novaya Orya (Yañı Urya) is a rural locality (a village) in Bayguzinsky Selsoviet, Yanaulsky District, Bashkortostan, Russia. The population was 149 as of 2010. There is 1 street.

Geography 
Novaya Orya is located 20 km southwest of Yanaul (the district's administrative centre) by road. Staraya Orya is the nearest rural locality.

References 

Rural localities in Yanaulsky District